The 2000 ACC Trophy was a cricket tournament held from 15 to 24 November 2000 in the United Arab Emirates. It gave Associate and Affiliate members of the Asian Cricket Council experience of international one-day cricket and also helped form an essential part of regional rankings.

The tournament was won by the host nation, who defeated Hong Kong in the final by three wickets. This was the United Arab Emirates' first title.

Teams
The following eight teams took part in the tournament:

Group stages
The eight teams were divided into two groups of four, with the top two from each group qualifying for the semi-finals.

Group A

Group B

Semi-finals

Final

Statistics

References

External links
CricketArchive tournament page 

ACC Trophy
ACC Trophy
International cricket competitions in 2000–01
International cricket competitions in the United Arab Emirates